Zákony vlka is a Czech television series that is scheduled to airs in 2023. It is directed by Marek Najbrt. It starrs Stanislav Majer as former criminal Robert Černý who is released from prison and assumes identity of a policeman in village in Brdy. First episode is to air on 18 March 2023 on Prima and its streaming service Prima+. Lucie Kršáková stated on 20 February 2023 that season 2 is in development.

Plot
Thief Robert Černý gets early release from prison. Coincidence brings him to the other side of the law. He finds himself in a remote village near border, with which he is connected not only by his fateful relationship with Sára but also by unresolved issues from the past.

Cast
Stanislav Majer as Robert Černý
Linda Rybová as Sára Pokorná
Jan Vondráček as Jiří Pokorný
Tereza Švejdová as rtn. Kamila Žáčková
Eliška Zelenková as Klára Pokorná
Jan Novotný as prap. Zdeněk Bureš
Kristýna Frejová as MUDr. Hana Brožková
Josef Polášek as Josef Horák
Martin Myšička as Vilém Karas

Production
The series was produced by 3GMedia. Gabriela Erleová and  Robert Geisler are listed as authors of series. It was filmed in Brdy forests. Season 2 started filming in Mníšek during March 2023.

References

External links 
Official site
IMDB site
ČSFD site

Czech crime television series
Czech romantic television series
2023 Czech television series debuts
Prima televize original programming